The Constitution of Puntland is the governing document and legal framework for the autonomous Puntland region of Somalia. It is the supreme law documenting the duties, powers, structure and function of the government of Puntland, subject only to Somalia's federal constitution. The current constitution, adopted on the 18 April 2012, is Puntland state's first and only permanent constitution.

Constitutions

1998 Provisional Charter
Delegates representing various local clans began arriving in Garowe from early May 1998 for the opening of the constitutional conference on 15 May. Organisation of the  “Shir Beeleed” (community conference), subsequently known as the “Shir-Beeleedka Dastuuriga ah ee Garowe” (Garowe Community Constitutional Conference), included the registration and accommodation of delegates, undertaken by a preparatory committee which organised the whole conference process and drafted the charter with the help of a group of international constitutional lawyers. Over 460 delegates representing the different sub-clans and social strata participated.  A provisional Charter was adopted in July and a president and vice-president were elected, marking the establishment of the Puntland State of Somalia.

2001 Constitution
A transitional constitution was adopted by the House of Representatives of Puntland on 05/06/2011. In conformity with Article 28, a constitutional commission was established and a new constitution proposed. The transitional constitution made way for an anticipated federal Somalia.

The constitution was based on the following provisions:

Islamic Sharia
The system of idea sharing and collective decision making
The proportionality of Government powers; Executive, Legislative and Judiciary
Decentralization of governmental power
A multi-party system
Ensuring the existence of private ownership and the free market
Ensuring the individual fundamental rights and life, security and general stability.

Provisions of the current Puntland constitution
The current Puntland constitution was adopted on 18 April 2012. Out of 480 representatives, 472 representatives voted to approve the draft constitution.

Title I: "The Puntland State And Its Founding Principles"
Article 1 - Name and purpose
Article 2 - Supremacy of the law
Article 3 - System of government
Article 4 - The people
Article 5 - The census
Article 6 - Land and boundaries
Article 7 - Language
Article 8 - Religion
Article 9 - Capital City
Article 10 - Flag, symbol and anthem

Title II: "The Fundamental Rights And Guarantees Of The Person"
Chapter 1 - Individual rights and their suspension
Section 1 - Individual Rights'''
Section 2 - State of Exception of Individual Liberties
Chapter 2 - Social Rights
Section 1 - The Family
Chapter 3 - Citizenship and Electoral Procedures'

Title III: "Economy"
Article 46 - The economic order purpose
Article 47 - Socio-economic system of a free enterprise
Article 48 - Natural Resources
Article 49 - Protection of the environment
Article 50 - The role of the state in the economy
Article 51 - Joint ventures companies
Article 52 - Transaction of public property
Article 53 - Nationalisation of private property

Title IV: "The Structure Of The Government"
Chapter 1 - The Fundamental Organs of the State
Article 54 - Parliamentary regime
Article 55 - The three organs of the state
Article 56 - Separation of organs
Article 57 - Cooperation of organs
Chapter 2 - The Legislature
Section 1 - The House of Representatives
Section 2 - The Process of Law Formation
Chapter 3 - The Executive
Chapter 4 - The Judiciary
Chapter 5 - Other Fundamental Institutions of the State
Section 1 - The Office of the Attorney General
Section 2 - The Office for the Defence and Promotion of Human Rights
Section 3 - The Auditor General
Section 4 - Electoral Authority
Chapter 6 - Regional and District Administration
Section 1 - Regional Administration
Section 2 - District Administrations

Title V: "The Administrative Government Of Puntland"
Chapter 1 - The Civil Service
Chapter 2 - Public Finances

Title VI: "Supremacy And Reform Of The Constitution"
Article 133 - Pre-eminence of the constitution
Article 134 - Constitutional reforms
Article 135 - Harmonization of this constitution with federal constitution
Article 136 - Enforcement of the constitution

External links
Constitution draft
2009 constitution

References

Law of Somalia